Du Yue (born 15 February 1998) is a Chinese badminton player. She won the silver medal at the 2014 Asian Junior Championships in the girls' doubles event partnered with Li Yinhui. She and Li then made it to the gold medal 2015. Du also claimed the girls' doubles gold in 2016 partnered with Xu Ya and doubled-up the title winning mixed doubles gold with He Jiting. She and He Jiting captured the gold medal at the 2016 World Junior Championships, which in the previous year they won the silver medal. She won her first senior international title at the 2017 China International Challenge tournament in the women's doubles event partnered with Xu Ya. Du was the mixed doubles silver medalist at the 2019 Asian Championships, and the women's doubles bronze medalist at the 2019 World Championships.

Career 
Du competed at the 2020 Summer Olympics in Tokyo, Japan. Partnered with Li Yinhui, they finished as the quarter-finalists after being defeated by the eventual gold medalists Greysia Polii and Apriyani Rahayu of Indonesia in three rubber games.

Achievements

BWF World Championships 
Women's doubles

Asian Championships 
Women's doubles

Mixed doubles

BWF World Junior Championships 
Women's doubles

Mixed doubles

Asian Junior Championships 
Women's doubles

Mixed doubles

BWF World Tour (4 titles, 5 runners-up) 
The BWF World Tour, which was announced on 19 March 2017 and implemented in 2018, is a series of elite badminton tournaments sanctioned by the Badminton World Federation (BWF). The BWF World Tour is divided into levels of World Tour Finals, Super 1000, Super 750, Super 500, Super 300 (part of the HSBC World Tour), and the BWF Tour Super 100.

Women's doubles

Mixed doubles

BWF Grand Prix (2 titles) 
The BWF Grand Prix had two levels, the Grand Prix and Grand Prix Gold. It was a series of badminton tournaments sanctioned by the Badminton World Federation (BWF) and played between 2007 and 2017.

Mixed doubles

  BWF Grand Prix Gold tournament
  BWF Grand Prix tournament

BWF International Challenge/Series (1 title) 
Women's doubles

  BWF International Challenge tournament
  BWF International Series tournament

References

External links 
 

1998 births
Living people
People from Yichang
Badminton players from Hubei
Chinese female badminton players
Badminton players at the 2020 Summer Olympics
Olympic badminton players of China